Tracy Heath Dildy (born November 26, 1966) is an American college basketball coach, currently an assistant coach at Detroit Mercy. He is also the former head men's basketball coach for Chicago State University, replacing Benjy Taylor as head coach of the Cougars on July 12, 2010. He coached the 2012–2013 team to a Great West Conference championship.

Head coaching record

Notes

External links
Chicago State bio
Player Bio: Tracy Dildy - UIC OFFICIAL ATHLETIC SITE
New Faces, New Places: Tracy Dildy - College Basketball Nation Blog - ESPN

 

1966 births
Living people
African-American basketball coaches
African-American basketball players
American men's basketball players
Auburn Tigers men's basketball coaches
Ball State Cardinals men's basketball coaches
Basketball coaches from Illinois
Basketball players from Chicago
Chicago State Cougars men's basketball coaches
College men's basketball head coaches in the United States
DePaul Blue Demons men's basketball coaches
Ole Miss Rebels men's basketball coaches
Point guards
Sportspeople from Chicago
UAB Blazers men's basketball coaches
UIC Flames men's basketball coaches
UIC Flames men's basketball players
Wisconsin Badgers men's basketball players
21st-century African-American people
20th-century African-American sportspeople